Lake Shaftsbury State Park is an 84-acre state park around Lake Shaftsbury in Shaftsbury, Vermont.

Activities includes swimming, non-motorized boating, fishing, picnicking, hiking, wildlife watching, camping and winter sports.

Facilities include non-motorized boat rentals, a snack bar, beach, restroom, play area and picnic area. There is a large open pavilion with electricity, grills, tables and chairs. Camping facilities include a fully furnished waterfront cottage that sleeps six, with deck and grill, and a group camping area with clusters of lean-tos. Port-a-let facilities are available. The park is located in Arlington State Forest.

References

External links
Official website

State parks of Vermont
Protected areas of Bennington County, Vermont
Shaftsbury, Vermont
1974 establishments in Vermont
Protected areas established in 1974